Stillwell-Preston House, also known as Riverwind (after the off-Broadway play of 1962), is located in Saddle River, Bergen County, New Jersey, United States. The house was built in 1800 and was added to the National Register of Historic Places on August 29, 1986.  It began as a farmhouse.  When improvements were made in the 1960s, square nails, handmade by a blacksmith, were removed from the walls.  At one point, the house to the North on East Saddle River Road was once the carriage house for the estate and the house North of that was where the caretakers lived.

Martin Block, host of the "Make Believe Ballroom--so, arguably, the first disk jockey--once lived there.  It was actually even larger, with a wing having been knocked down in the 1950s.  Once owned by a retired Navy captain, he painted most of the interior battleship gray, since he had the paint and "help" available.

In the 1960s, the home was owned by Fred Pfister (who named it "Riverwind").  Fred had previously owned the equally historic Fell House in nearby Allendale, New Jersey.  Fred died in July 1969 and his wake was held in the majestic 60-foot-long living room because of his deep love of this beautiful home.  His family lived there until 1972.

There are ten fireplaces, and those in the bedrooms were faced with carved marble imported from Italy.

See also
National Register of Historic Places listings in Bergen County, New Jersey

References

Houses on the National Register of Historic Places in New Jersey
Federal architecture in New Jersey
Colonial Revival architecture in New Jersey
Houses completed in 1800
Houses in Bergen County, New Jersey
Saddle River, New Jersey
National Register of Historic Places in Bergen County, New Jersey
New Jersey Register of Historic Places